Song For Josia (released 2014 in Oslo, Norway by Øra Fonogram – OF034) is the second solo album by the saxophonist Hanna Paulsberg, as "Hanna Paulsberg Concept".

Reception 
The review by Fredrik Wandrup of the Norwegian newspaper Dagbladet awarded the album dice 5. Kongsberg Jazzfestival reviewer Tor Dalaker Lund awarded the album Record of the month, March.

Review 
The saxophone by the leader herself tell us that Shorter and Miles acoustic bands are very much her inspiration. All the compositions are made by Paulsberg, and the music is always in motion, carefully lifted by the rhythm strong section.

This is Paulsberg's second album, following up her successful solo debut Waltz For Lilli (2012), just over a year ago. Now it is with regards to one of her musical friends in Madagaskar, where she has just presented her music live on the Madajazzkar Festival.

TheJazzBreakfast.com critique Peter Bacon, in his review of Paulsberg's album Song For Josia states:

Track listing 
All compositions by Hanna Paulsberg

Recorded in Øra Studio 7th - 9th 2013

Personnel 
Hanna Paulsberg - saxophone
Trygve Waldemar Fiske - acoustic bass
Oscar Grönberg - piano
Hans Hulbækmo - drums

Notes 
Cover art & design – Heida Karine Johannesdottir Mobeck
Innside photo - Andreas Hansson
Mastering – Jo Ranheim in Redroom studios
Mixing – Jo Ranheim, Jostein Ansnes

References 

Hanna Paulsberg albums
2014 albums